Sergei Chislov (alternative spelling: Sergey Chislov), born November 4, 1960 in Moscow, USSR, is a 3-time USSR Professional 10-Dance champion, certified International Dance Adjudicator of World Dance Council (WDC), ballroom dance coach, USSR Master of Sport in ballroom dancing, choreographer, and a film actor. As of 2013,  he lives and works in Miami, FL, United States.

Biography
Sergei Chislov was born to a family of engineers in Moscow, USSR. Sergei started dancing at the age of 17 years when he started learning to waltz for the graduation party at the secondary school. After graduation Sergei started his dancing education at the Sports and Dance Center '726' in 1978. He continued training at this club till 1988. During that period of time Sergei became 3-time USSR Professional 10-Dance champion and	a multiple winner of national and international ballroom dancesport competitions.

List of international dance competitions and festivals of ballroom dancing where Sergei Chislov represented the USSR:

 Usti nad Labem,  Czechoslovakia (former Czech Republic), 1982-1986
 Festival in Berlin, International Ballroom Dance Competition, Berlin, Leipzig, Germany – 1982-1987
 Savaria Szombathely, International Ballroom Dance Competition, Hungary, 1983-1988
 International Ballroom Dance Competition, Vilnius, Latvia, 1986
 Leipziger Messe, International Ballroom Dance Competition, Leipzig, GDR, 1987
 Usti nad Labem, Czechoslovakia, 1985)
 Open International Dance Championship, Germany, 1989

Sergei started his training career in 1980 while still taking part in dance competitions. In 1989 he announced his retirement from competitions and founded his own dance instruction club 'Dzhem.'  He coached a number of young dancers, some of them became winners of European and world championships. Along with his training career Sergei Chislov started his judging career, and today he is a certified International Dance Adjudicator of World Dance Council. Today Sergei works as a trainer at VK Dance Center in Miami, Fl and pursues his own project New Dance Dimension which is claimed to be "...an idea brought to life by four famous choreographers and multiple-time winners of world championships." Sergei has recently made his acting debut in Russian movie "Snezhnaya Koroleva" directed by Natalia Bondarchuk.

Notable students

Ilya Svintsov and Lubov Bondareva
 Bronze medalist of the World Latin Dance Championship 2008 (IPDSC)-International Professional Dance Sport Council – Italy, Countries:  (Italy, Israel, England, Spain, Russia, Norway, Poland, Georgia, Germany, Lithuania)
 Second place at the European Professional Dance Championship, version IPDSC-International Professional Dance Sport Council-2008, total in the competition participated couples from more than 10 countries.(Italy, England, Spain, Germany, Russia, Ukraine, Latvia, Australia, Poland, France, Finland)
 Silver winners of the World Latin Dance 2008 in Taipei. Representatives from 13 countries participated in the competition organized by Royce and Mary Yeh.
Alexandr Poliakov
 Vice-Champion in Latin American Dancing
 World Dance Cup Finalist
 World and European vice-champion among the Professionals Latin American Danceshow
 A multiple winner of Dance International Championships
Anna Melnikova
 World Champion in professional Latin American Dances
 Winner WDC Professional World South American Showdance, 2011
 Silver medalist USA Open Dance Championships, Winner Blackpool Dance Festival, United Kingdom
 Winner IDSF European Latin Championship-Germany, Winner, Copenhagen
 Open International Dance Competition-Denmark, Winner Italian Amateur Championships
 Winner UK Open Dance Championships-England, Winner Tattersall's Australian Open-Melbourne
 Winner Monaco Dancesport Festival
 Winner IDSF Grand Slam Finals-Japan
 Winner International Championships-England, Winner Imperial-England

References

External links

 Sergei Chislov's personal website
 VK Dance Center Official Website

1960 births
Living people
Russian ballroom dancers
Russian choreographers
Russian male dancers
21st-century Russian dancers
20th-century Russian dancers